Let It Snow! is an EP by Canadian artist Michael Bublé, released in the United States on November 25, 2003. It was later re-released in the United States on October 8, 2007, and in the United Kingdom on October 16, 2007. The EP was made available as a digital download and CD in the United States, however, the CD release in the UK was exclusive to HMV stores. The EP includes five, new unreleased tracks.

The EP was later reissued as a bonus CD with the deluxe edition of Bublé's self-titled debut album. Some of the songs on the EP were later re-recorded for inclusion on Bublé's fifth studio album, Christmas (2011). The track "Grown Up Christmas List" was serviced to radio in promotion of the EP. A re-release of the original 2003 album went on sale in 2007, and a live version of "Let It Snow!" was added.

The EP has sold 1,032,000 copies as of December 2012.

Track listing

Charts

Weekly charts

Year-end charts

Release history

References 

Michael Bublé albums
2003 Christmas albums
2003 EPs
Reprise Records EPs
Christmas albums by Canadian artists
Pop Christmas albums